.mf is an assigned Internet country code top-level domain (ccTLD) that was to be created for the Collectivity of Saint Martin, but it is currently not in use, as it is not available for registration nor website use of the domain. The decision by the ISO 3166 Maintenance Agency to allocate .mf as the ISO 3166-1 alpha-2 domain for Saint Martin on 21 September 2007, followed the decision of Saint Martin's new status as an Overseas collectivity of France, which took effect on 15 July 2007.
Currently Saint Martin uses Guadeloupe's ccTLD, .gp and France's ccTLD, .fr.

See also
Internet in Saint Martin
Internet in Guadeloupe
Internet in France
 ISO 3166-2:MF
 .gp –CC TLD for Guadeloupe
 .fr –CC TLD for the French Republic
 .eu –CC TLD for the European Union
 .sx –CC TLD for Sint Maarten, the Dutch side of the island.

References

External links
 IANA .mf whois information

Country code top-level domains
Communications in the Collectivity of Saint Martin
Computer-related introductions in 2007

sv:Toppdomän#B